American rapper Rico Nasty's discography consists of one studio album, six mixtapes, one extended play, seventy-six singles (including thirty-six as a featured artist), forty-five music videos, and one promotional single. In her early high school career she self-released her debut mixtape, Summer's Eve, in 2014. This release was the forerunner of several more independent mixtapes such as The Rico Story (2016), Sugar Trap (2016), Tales of Tacobella (2017) and Sugar Trap 2 (2017). 

Her major-label debut mixtape, Nasty, was released under Atlantic Records on June 15, 2018. It was followed up by the collaborative mixtape Anger Management with producer Kenny Beats in April 2019. Her breakthrough single, "Smack A Bitch" (2018), was certified Gold by the Recording Industry Association of America in June 2020, becoming her first career certification. Her debut studio album, Nightmare Vacation was released on December 4, 2020.

Studio albums

Mixtapes

Extended plays

Singles

As lead artist

As featured artist

Promotional singles

Guest appearances

Songwriting credits

Music videos

As lead artist

As featured artist

Guest appearances

References

External links
 
 
 
 

Discographies of American artists
Rap rock discographies